Katherine Stewart-Jones (born 5 May 1995) is a Canadian cross-country skier who competes internationally.

Career
She competed for Canada at the FIS Nordic World Ski Championships 2017 in Lahti, Finland.

On January 13, 2022, Stewart-Jones was officially named to Canada's 2022 Olympic team.

Cross-country skiing results
All results are sourced from the International Ski Federation (FIS).

Olympic Games

World Championships

World Cup

Season standings

References

External links 
 

1995 births
Living people
Canadian female cross-country skiers
Skiers from Ottawa
Cross-country skiers at the 2022 Winter Olympics
Olympic cross-country skiers of Canada
21st-century Canadian women